Legacy, Part 2: Passion is a live album from Planetshakers, recorded live during the 20th anniversary. Planetshakers Conference at Hisense Arena in Melbourne, Australia. Planetshakers Ministries International and Integrity Music released the album on 14 July 2017.

On 22 July 2017 the album secured the No. 46 spot on the ARIA Top 50 Chart. This was Planetshaker's sixth entry on ARIA's Top 50 Chart.

Critical reception

Giving the album four stars at New Release Today, Caitlin Lassiter says, "This EP is one of the most genuine-feeling expressions of praise I've heard in a long time. What it lacks in track length, it more than makes up for in lyrical depth, engaging vocals and powerful worship moments captured in their live setting". 

Madeleine Dittmer, in a four star review for The Christian Beat, wrote: "Legacy Part 2: Passion, contains well written, produced, and played live worship tracks that provide the soundtrack for a full worship experience, from a dance party to a powerful time of prayer and praise. It is arguably one of Planetshaker's best, and it is definitely an album you’ll want to add to your collection". 

Joshua Andre, in a four star review for 365 Days of Inspiring Media says, "Overall is an enjoyable EP that has definitely continues my reinvigorated interest for Planetshakers a bit more; this track list has certainly created momentum (no pun intended!), and given me new songs to sing out to Jesus during times of joy and hardship".

Track listing

Personnel
 Joth Hunt – singer
 Samantha Evans – singer
 Rudy Nikkerud – singer
 Chelsi Nikkerud – singer
 BJ Pridham – singer
 Natalie Ruiz – singer
 Steven Sowden – singer
 Natasha Tripodi – singer
 Uli Flores – singer
 Aimee Evans – singer
 Josh Ham – bass guitar
 Andy Harrison – drums
 Mitch Wong – keyboards
 Scott Lim – keyboards

Charts
Legacy, Part 2: Passion debuted at #3 on the iTunes Christian and Gospel Charts.

References

2017 live albums
Planetshakers albums